Acacia umbraculiformis, commonly known as western umbrella wattle, is a tree belonging to the genus Acacia and the subgenus Juliflorae native to western Australia.

Description
It has glabrous branchlets with resinous new shoots. Like most species of Acacia it has phyllodes rather than true leaves. The dark brown to black, firmly coriaceous-crustaceous to sub-woody seed pods that form after flowering have a narrowly oblong to linear shape or occasionally resemble as string of beads. The longitudinally arranged dark brown to black coloured seeds have an oblong to elliptic shape and are quite flattened.

Distribution
It is native to an area in the Mid West, northern Wheatbelt and Goldfields regions of Western Australia. The bulk of the population is found from around Cue and Mount Magnet in the north down to around Koorda in the south and to around Morawa in the west. An isolated population is also known further north around Meekatharra. It is often situated on slopes and hill crests usually over granite or occasionally ironstone as a part of Acacia woodland or shrubland communities.

See also
List of Acacia species

References

umbraculiformis
Acacias of Western Australia
Plants described in 2008
Taxa named by Bruce Maslin